Anthony Lechmere (1674–1720), of Hanley Castle, Worcestershire, was an English Member of Parliament.

He was a Member (MP) of the Parliament of Great Britain for Bewdley from 10 October to 20 December 1710 and for Tewkesbury from 18 June 1714 to 17 June 1717.

References

1674 births
1720 deaths
People from Malvern Hills District
British MPs 1710–1713
British MPs 1713–1715
British MPs 1715–1722
Politicians from Worcestershire
Members of the Parliament of Great Britain for Tewkesbury